Montague Island (Barunguba) is a continental island contained within the Montague Island Nature Reserve, a protected nature reserve that is located offshore from the South Coast region of New South Wales, in eastern Australia.

History
The island has been known to the local group of Yuin people, an Aboriginal nation, as Barunguba, and there are Aboriginal sites of significance across the island. It features in Aboriginal mythology, as the eldest son of Gulaga (Mount Dromedary), the mother. Her younger son, Najanuka (Little Dromedary), was not allowed to go far from home as Barunguba did, but Gulaga can still see her both her sons in the distance.

The island was first sighted by Europeans in 1770 by James Cook and named Cape Dromedary, then identified as an island and named by the master of the Second Fleet convict transport Surprize after George Montagu-Dunk, 2nd Earl of Halifax.

Dual naming
After a period of community consultation from mid-2021, the island was officially assigned the dual names of Montague Island and Barunguba on 30 November 2021. Signage will place Barunguba  reflecting the importance of the Dhurga language, history and traditions. Gulaga and Najanuka / Little Dromedary Mountain were dual-named at the same time.

Description
Montague Island, situated off the South Coast of New South Wales near Narooma, is the second largest island off the NSW coast after Lord Howe Island, and forms part of the Montague Island Nature Reserve. It has been classified by the National Trust as a Landscape Conservation Area for its scenic, scientific and historical values. The Montague Island Light buildings are entered on the Register of the National Estate because of the architectural quality of the tower and residences.

Montague Island is a popular tourist destination, known for its lighthouse, wildlife, most especially little penguins (Eudyptula minor), and recreational activities; managed by the NSW National Parks & Wildlife Service (NPWS). Public access to the island is restricted to guided tours conducted by the NPWS in association with private operators.

Lighthouse

A lighthouse called Montague Island Light is maintained on the island by the Australian Maritime Safety Authority. The lighthouse was designed by James Barnet and built in 1881. It was automated in 1986 and was no longer staffed in 1987. The original Fresnel lens was removed in 1986 and is now on display at the Narooma Lighthouse Museum.

The next lighthouse to the north is the Burrewarra Point lighthouse. Amateur radio expeditions to the island were organised in 2010 and 2011.

Wildlife 
Forty-nine species of fauna have been recorded on the island by the National Parks and Wildlife Service NSW.

Little penguins 
The island is home to a large colony of little penguins on the island.  As the island has no foxes or feral cats, the penguins have no predators other than other seabirds and seals.  With the restoration of native habitat and the provision of penguin breeding boxes, penguin numbers have increased, and there are now approximately 12,000 on the island.  The female usually lays two eggs, and during a good year, both chicks will survive.  The birds come ashore at dusk after feeding at sea, and visitors to the island can watch the birds from a platform near the jetty.

Crested terns 
Crested terns, Sterna bergii,  have brilliant white feathers covering the body while the head is completely black.

Shearwaters 
Shearwaters, also known as mutton birds, nest on the island.  Species recorded are:
 Puffinus bulleri (Buller's shearwater)
 Puffinus griseus (sooty shearwater)
 Puffinus pacificus (wedge-tailed shearwater)
 Puffinus tenuirostris (short-tailed shearwater)

Seals 
The northern tip of the island is the seasonal home to a seal bachelor colony.  Due to the site's remoteness, it is only possible for visitors to see them from a boat.

The majority of the seals are Australian fur seals, (Arctocephalus pusillus doriferus), New Zealand fur seals (Arctocephalus forsteri), subantarctic fur seals (Arctocephalus tropicalis) and Australian sea lions (Neophoca cinerea) have also been observed.

Environmental restoration 
Kikuyu grass is a major weed on the island.  Originally introduced in the early 19th century to help feed the animals kept by the lighthouse keepers and their families, it has spread to cover most of the south island.  To control it, NPWS officers poison a section, then burn it, before replanting with help from volunteers.  In the less accessible areas of the northern and eastern parts, an aerial spraying program is used to manage the kikuyu where it infests shearwater breeding sites.  The kikuyu is a barrier for the shearwaters and penguins, who cannot penetrate it to move or to burrow. Various native species are used to replant areas after the kikuyu grass has been controlled.

Climate

See also

 List of islands of New South Wales
 Protected areas of New South Wales

References

External links 

Montague Island - Local and Tourist information
Narooma - Local and Tourist information
Montague Island - VisitNSW

Islands of New South Wales
Protected areas of New South Wales
Island restoration
1990 establishments in Australia
Protected areas established in 1990
Penguin colonies